Good Grief may refer to:


Places
 Good Grief, Idaho, an unincorporated community in the United States

Literature
 Good Grief, a book by Keith Waterhouse
 "Good grief", a catchphrase of the Peanuts character Charlie Brown

Music
 Good Grief (album), a 2016 album by Lucius
 "Good Grief" (song), a 2016 song by Bastille
 "Good Grief" (Spacey Jane song)
 "Good Grief" (Hayley Williams song)
 "Good Grief", song by Foo Fighters from the album Foo Fighters, 1995

Television
 "Good Grief" (Arrested Development episode)
 "Good Grief" (Frasier episode)
 "Good Grief" (Modern Family)
 Good Grief (TV series), an American TV series that aired on Fox for one season in 1990 
 Good Grief, Charlie Brown: A Tribute to Charles Schulz, a 2000 television special 
 Good Grief Moncrieff!, an Irish TV series that aired on RTĖ during summer 1996

See also
 Oh Good Grief!, a 1968 album by Vince Guaraldi
 Good God (disambiguation)